Winmalee is a town in New South Wales, Australia. Winmalee is located 77 kilometres west of Sydney, in the local government area of the City of Blue Mountains.

Originally known as North Springwood, Winmalee was officially established in 1972. Springwood is historically significant as the first European settlement in the Blue Mountains. Winmalee is surrounded by Blue Mountains National Park. This National Park is on the World Heritage List and is known as the Greater Blue Mountains Area World Heritage Site. The Blue Mountains area is unofficially known as "The City Within a World Heritage National Park". Winmalee extends from Birdwood Avenue and Paulwood Avenue to Coramandel Avenue and east to a point part-way along Singles Ridge Road.

History
It is commonly believed that Winmalee is an Aboriginal word for north. But, as Aboriginal cultures did not use north, south, east or west, this is doubtful. It is more likely a corruption of the world Wimlah, the name of one of the Three Sisters, a rock formation 35 km to the west. The name was coined by 14-year-old, who won a competition to find a name for North Springwood when the Geographical Names Board wanted to remove the compass prefixes from the names of towns and suburbs of New South Wales.

Aboriginal heritage
The area now officially known as Winmalee was once inhabited by Aboriginal Australians known as the Dharug tribe. This was a nomadic tribe which inhabited much of the Lower Blue Mountains until European colonisation and settlement. The dialect spoken by the tribe is known as the Dharug language. Current figures place the date of this settlement as beginning up to 50,000 years ago.

Except for a small number of descendants there are no members of the Dharug tribe now living in the area. The majority of this group were thought to have moved northward in the Blue Mountains and to have merged with the Gundungurra tribe. Others are thought to have been wiped out during European exploration and settlement. Archaeological evidence from the aboriginal inhabitants is common throughout Winmalee and includes several open sites and occupation shelters.

European settlement
In 1970, the Geographical Names Board of New South Wales suggested that the area which had been unofficially known as 'North Springwood' be made an independent suburb of the Blue Mountains and renamed 'White Cross' because of the rapidly increasing population growth of Springwood. However residents of the area objected to the name 'White Cross'.

In 1971, the Department of Education selected "Winmalee" as the name for a new school in the area. Though the residents of the area approved this as the name for the proposed school they rejected it as a name for the suburb. The name Winmalee was chosen by the Department of Education as the result of a competition that had been organised amongst the local people. Terry Macauley, who was to be one of the school's original primary students, suggested the name "Winmalee", a supposed Aboriginal word for North. The word was in fact never used by the Dharug people in relation to the area, but is instead a reference to its previous unofficial name.

Winmalee was finally officially established as an independent town on 28 April 1972 after the Minister for Lands, Tom Lewis MLA announced the suburb's independence from Springwood and approved the name Winmalee despite objections from residents.

October 2013 bushfires 
The town, the nearby village of Yellow Rock and a small part of the adjacent town of Springwood were badly affected by a bushfire which started on 17 October 2013. 196 residential properties were destroyed, and 109 damaged. 40 homes were destroyed on Buena Vista Road in Winmalee alone.

Schools

High schools
The first High School established in the Winmalee area was St Columba's High School. Originally a Catholic seminary, it was re-established as a high school in 1979, but did not cater for years 11 and 12 until 1993. The school and its grounds are some of the oldest forms of architecture in the area. The St Columbas property is one of the largest property holdings in the Blue Mountains and is rich in native flora and fauna. The whole of the St Columbas property is a Heritage property.  St Columba's High School established the first Japanese sister school agreement in the Blue Mountains with Hokusetsu Sanda Senior High School in Sanda, Hyōgo.
 Winmalee High School was the first high school developed after the suburb was named Winmalee and had established independence. It was officially established in 1985. Winmalee High has Sister School agreements with Arima Senior High School in Sanda City, Japan, Aurora College in Invercargill, New Zealand and Hillcrest School in Birmingham, UK

Primary schools
 St Thomas Aquinas Primary School - Opened in 1921 with a total school enrolment of 24 pupils. The school was staffed up until the early 1980s by the Sisters of St Joseph. The school moved to its current site off Hawkesbury Road in 1982, which is situated on the same grounds as St Columba's High School.
 Winmalee Public School - The school's first year was in 1972 when pupils boarded at Springwood Primary. The first classes were held at Winmalee in the last weeks of 1972, but the school began on the site at the beginning of 1973.
 Ellison Public School - Ellison Public School received its first complement of pupils in February 1986 under the supervising care of its foundation principal, and a staff of eight teachers. With an initial enrolment of 228 pupils, the school was organized into eight classes catering for kindergarten through to fifth grade. While Ellison Public lies within the town boundaries of Springwood, it draws students from both Winmalee and Springwood.

Churches
Winmalee is the site of the 'Holy Monastery of St George', a monastic community for men under the Greek Orthodox Archdiocese of Australia.

Other churches in Winmalee include: 
 St. Thomas Aquinas Catholic Church
 St Georges Anglican Church Winmalee (part of Anglican Churches Springwood)
 Winmalee Presbyterian Church (part of Springwood Winmalee Presbyterian Church)
 Winmalee Gospel Chapel (part of Christian Brethren in NSW)

Parks and recreation
Summerhayes Park is a public reserve which is used for sport and recreational activities. Its facilities include tennis and netball/basketball courts, a skate park, outdoor gym equipment and fields for Football (soccer) both local (NDSFA) and Representative (FNSW) all year round. It is the home of Springwood United Football Club (formally Springwood Soccer & Sports Club), Winmalee Netball Club, Springwood Netball Club and a variety of other clubs. Summerhayes Park has a rich diversity of native flora and fauna and contains many threatened or endangered species and ecological communities. It is also a great bushwalking area with many interesting tracks, vistas and aboriginal archeological sites

Commercial area

The Winmalee Village centre was officially opened in the early 1980s and refurbished in 2005. It comprises 22 specialty shops including Coles Supermarket, Liquorland, Chemmart Pharmacy, Sports Club, Vet and other specialty shops. Target Country closed its store in the centre in 2021. There is a small food court which has a Donut King, Domino's Pizza and a Michel's Patisserie. Fletch's Tavern is located near the mall, as well as a dance studio.

There are also other smaller shopping districts. There is a small strip mall located on Hawkesbury Road with a Caltex petrol station, car mechanic, takeaway shop, butcher, hair salon and a general store. The Australia Post office has moved to the Winmalee Village Centre. There is also another very small shopping area, near the Village Centre, with a pizza shop, hairdressers and a gymnasium.

Winmalee Rural Fire Brigade
Winmalee Rural Fire Brigade is one of many Volunteer Fire Brigades located in New South Wales. The Brigade is a part of the NSW Rural Fire Service and started life as North Springwood Bush Fire Brigade in 1962. It currently has about 50 operationally active members with a reserve of approximately 150 people, with a total fire fighting experience in excess of 2200 years. Winmalee Rural Fire Brigade is a unique Brigade within the Blue Mountains Area as it is classed as a Village 2 Brigade which means it has an Urban Pumper Plus it carries Compressed Air Breathing Apparatus.

The brigade was heavily involved in the 2013 NSW Bushfires.

Population
In the 2016 Census there were 6,202 people residing in Winmalee (51.7% female, 48.3% male). The population consisted of 82.9% born in Australia, including 2.3% Aboriginal or Torres Strait Islander. 5.1% were born in England, 1.1% New Zealand, 0.8% Scotland, 0.7% United States and 0.6% Germany. In the voluntary question about religion, the most common responses in Winmalee were No Religion, 29.1%, Catholic 25.4%, Anglican 20.2%, Not stated 6.2% and Presbyterian and Reformed 4.3%. Christianity was the largest religious group reported overall (66.6%) in Winmalee.

References

External links
Bushcare in the Blue Mountains
Winmalee Rural Fire Brigade

Towns in New South Wales
Suburbs of the City of Blue Mountains
Populated places established in 1972